

The NASA Hyper III was an American unpowered full-scale lifting body remotely piloted vehicle designed and built at the NASA Flight Research Center at Edwards Air Force Base, California.

Design and development
The Hyper III was designed to help in the M2 lifting body program, it had a flat bottom and sides, and a simple straight wing with no control surfaces that was designed to simulate a pop-out wing that had been proposed for a re-entry vehicle. The Hyper III had twin fins and rudders canted at 40° from the vertical, and hinged elevons on the horizontal surface. The landing gear was a fixed tricycle type, using spring steel legs from a Cessna aircraft. It was fitted with an emergency parachute system and controlled by 5-channel radio link; instrument data was downlinked using a 12-channel radio.

On 12 December 1969 the Hyper III was launched from a helicopter at 10,000 feet. It glided 5 km, turned round, came back and landed. After the three-minute flight it was not flown again as the Center cancelled the program.

Specifications

See also

References

Notes

Bibliography

External links
 NASA Hyper III photo collection and additional information

Lifting bodies
1960s United States experimental aircraft
Hyper III
Glider aircraft